Shenzhen East station, formerly Pu Kuut station and Buji station, is located in Buji Subdistrict, Longgang District, Shenzhen, in Guangdong. It is a station on the Guangzhou–Shenzhen Railway.

History
The station opened in 1911 as a freight and Level 3 passenger station on the Kowloon–Canton Railway. Initial renovation works commenced in 2004. The station building was demolished in April 2008, and work began on the construction of a new passenger hub that was completed by the end of October 2012. 

In September 2012, it was announced that the new station would be named "Shenzhen East Station". The Shenzhen East name was originally assigned to a proposed Longgang Station on the Xiamen–Shenzhen Railway, currently named Shenzhen Pingshan Station

Structure

The station is a complex serving 3 separate railway lines (2 high-speed lines and 1 conventional rail line). The completed station building features 3 ticket halls and a waiting hall of 7,100m². There are 6 north-south platforms serving 11 tracks on the main platform level. Separate east-west platforms will serve trains on the Xiamen-Shenzhen High-Speed Railway (u/c). The station is adjacent to Buji Station on the Shenzhen Metro, served by Line 3 and Line 5.

Train services

The new Shenzhen East will handle middle- and long-distance, lower-speed trains, including trains to Sichuan, Hunan, Hubei, Jiangxi and Anhui provinces. Shenzhen railway station will be the main hub for intercity trains in Guangdong Province, for example, and its current long-distance trains to Beijing, Shanghai, Chengdu, Guilin and Fuzhou will be relocated to Shenzhen East in the future.

This station was initially designed for stopping by Guangzhou–Shenzhen Railway intercity trains, but the plan is abandoned after construction was nearly completed, and Pinghu has become the additional station for intercity trains afterwards. This station is now exclusively used for non-high-speed services.

References

Railway stations in Shenzhen
Railway stations in China opened in 1911
Stations on the Beijing–Kowloon Railway
Stations on the Guangzhou–Shenzhen Railway